Lady Antebellum is the debut studio album by American country music trio Lady Antebellum. It was released on April 15, 2008, through Capitol Nashville. The production on the album was handled by Victoria Shaw and Paul Worley. The album was supported by three singles: "Love Don't Live Here", "Lookin' for a Good Time" and "I Run to You", which became the group's first number one on the US Hot Country Songs chart.

Lady Antebellum received generally positive reviews from music critics and was also a commercial success. The album debuted at 
four on the US Billboard 200 chart, selling 43,000 copies in its first week. The album also debuted at number one on the US Top Country Albums chart, becoming the first debut by a country group to achieve this. It also received a nomination for Album of the Year at the 2010 Academy of Country Music Awards.

Singles
Its lead-off single, "Love Don't Live Here", was released in late 2007 and entered the Top 5 on the Billboard Hot Country Songs charts in May 2008. A second single, "Lookin' for a Good Time", was issued in June 2008, and peaked at number 11. "I Run to You" followed as the third single from the album in January 2009, and became the group's first number-one single on the Hot Country Songs chart in July 2009.

Commercial performance
Lady Antebellum debuted at number four on the US Billboard 200 chart, selling 43,000 copies in its first week. This became Lady Antebellum's first US top-ten debut. The album also debuted at number one on the US Top Country Albums chart. On November 10, 2010, the album was certified double platinum by the Recording Industry Association of America (RIAA) for shipments of over two million copies in the US. As of January 2011, the album has sold 1,826,368 copies in the United States.

Track listing

Personnel
As listed in liner notes.

Lady Antebellum
Hillary Scott – lead vocals, background vocals
Charles Kelley – lead vocals, background vocals
Dave Haywood – acoustic guitar, electric guitar, piano, mandolin, background vocals

Additional musicians

David Angell – violin
Bruce Bouton – dobro, steel guitar
John Catchings – cello
Chad Cromwell – drums, tambourine, shaker
Eric Darken – percussion
David Davidson — violin 
Larry Franklin – fiddle
Jason "Slim" Gambill – electric guitar
Jim Grosjean – viola

Anthony LaMarchina — cello
Rob McNelley – electric guitar, slide guitar
Michael Rojas – synthesizer, piano, accordion, Hammond B-3 organ, Wurlitzer
Victoria Shaw – background vocals
Pamela Sixfin - violin 
Mary Kathryn Van Osdale – violin 
Brice Williams – drums
Paul Worley – acoustic guitar, electric guitar, soloist
Craig Young – bass guitar

Strings performed by the Nashville String Machine; conducted and arranged by Kris Wilkinson.

Production

Natthaphol Abhigantaphand – assistant, mixing assistant 
Shelley Anderson – mastering assistant 
Denis Arguijo — art producer
Andrew Bazinet — assistant, assistant engineer 
Joanna Carter – art direction 
Mike Casteel – copyist 
Paige Conners – production coordination
Erik Hellerman – engineer 
Chris Hickey — photography
Brent Kaye — assistant, mixing assistant 

Stephen Lamb — copyist
Andrew Mendelson — mastering
Lee Moore — stylist, wardrobe 
Clarke Schleicher – mixing engineer, string engineer 
Victoria Shaw — audio production, producer
Andrew Southam – photography
Gleen Sweitzer — logo design
Matt Taylor Band – design
Debra Williams - hair stylist, make-up
Paul Worley – audio production, liner notes, producer

Charts

Weekly charts

Year-end charts

Singles

Certifications

References

External links
Information on album from Lady Antebellum official website

2008 debut albums
Albums produced by Paul Worley
Capitol Records Nashville albums
Lady A albums